Shaib or Sha‘ib, or the Sheikhdom of Shaib, was a state in the Aden Protectorate, South Arabia. The area is now part of the Republic of Yemen.

History
The Sha`ib Sheikhdom was established at an uncertain date in the 18th century. After becoming a British protectorate, it eventually joined the Federation of Arab Emirates of the South as well as its successor, the Federation of South Arabia.
Its last sheikh, Yahya Mohamed Al-Kholaqi Al-Saqladi, was exiled in 1967 upon the founding of the People's Republic of South Yemen. He died in Jeddah, Saudi Arabia in July 2001.

Rulers
The rulers of the Sha`ib Sheikhdom had the title of Shaykh Sha`ib.

Sheikhs 
c.1850 - 1880              Mani` al-Saqladi 
1880 - 1915                `Ali ibn Mani` al-Saqladi 
1915 - 1935                Mutahhar ibn Mani` al-Saqladi 
1935 - 1948                Muhammad ibn Muqbil al-Saqladi 
Aug 1948 - 1954            Kassem ibn Mused ibn Ali al-Saqladi 
1955 - 30 Mar 1963         Yahya ibn Muhammad al-Saqladi 
1963 -  7 Jul 1965         Nashir ibn `Abd Allah al-Saqladi     (d. 1965)
10 Jul 1965 - Jun 1967     Yahya ibn Mohamed Al Kholaqi al-Saqladi

See also
Aden Protectorate

References

External links
Map of Arabia (1905-1923) including the states of Aden Protectorate

States in the Aden Protectorate
Federation of South Arabia
Former monarchies of Asia